The 1st Hong Kong Awards ceremony, honoured the best films of 1981 and took place on 9 March 1982, at the Hong Kong Arts Centre Shouson Theatre in Wan Chai, Hong Kong. The ceremony was hosted by Eric Ng and Zhan Xiaoping, during the ceremony awards are presented in 5 categories. The ceremony was sponsored by RTHK and City Entertainment Magazine.

Awards
Winners are listed first, highlighted in boldface, and indicated with a double dagger.

Footnotes

References

External links
Official website of the Hong Kong Film Awards

1982
1981 film awards
1982 in Hong Kong